The Marvels is an upcoming superhero film and the sequel to Captain Marvel (2019).

The Marvels may also refer to:

 The Marvels (band), a reggae group active from 1962–1982
 The Marvels (book), by Brian Selznick, 2015
 The Marvels, an issue of the 2017 comic book Generations

See also
 Marvel (disambiguation)
 Marvels (disambiguation)